Robin William Renwick, Baron Renwick of Clifton,  (born 13 December 1937) is a former diplomat and a former member of the House of Lords. He was appointed by Prime Minister Blair but moved to the crossbenches in 2007. He retired from the House in 2018.

Lord Renwick was educated at St Paul's School and graduated from Jesus College, Cambridge, in 1962 with a Master of Arts in history.  He further studied at the Sorbonne.

From 1956 to 1958 he completed national service in the British Army. In 1963 he entered the British Foreign Service and had the postings detailed below.

Renwick was appointed a Companion of the Order of St Michael and St George (CMG) in the 1980 New Year Honours and was promoted to Knight Commander (KCMG) in the 1989 New Year Honours.

He was recommended for a life peerage and created Baron Renwick of Clifton, of Chelsea in the Royal Borough of Kensington & Chelsea, on 26 September 1997.

Diplomatic posts held

Diplomatic service:
Dakar, Senegal, 1963–64
Foreign Office, 1964–66
New Delhi, 1966–70
Private Secretary to Minister of State, Foreign & Commonwealth Office, 1970–72
First Secretary, Paris, 1972–76
Counsellor, Cabinet Office, 1976–78
Head of Rhodesia Department, FCO, 1978–80
Political Adviser to Governor of Rhodesia, 1980
Head of Chancery, Washington, 1981–84
Assistant Under-Secretary of State for European affairs, FCO, 1984–87. Helped to negotiate the 1984 UK rebate, a two-thirds reduction in the British financial contribution to the European Communities

Ambassador to:
South Africa, 1987–91; involved in the release of Nelson Mandela
United States, 1991–95

Directorates held

Lord Renwick has served on the board of directors of the following firms:

BHP
British Airways
Richemont
Fluor Corporation
Harmony Gold
Kazakhmys
SABMiller

He also served as Deputy Chairman, Robert Fleming Bank, then Deputy Chairman, Fleming Family and Partners

Vice-chairman, JP Morgan Europe
Vice-chairman, JP Morgan Cazenove (previously Cazenove) 
 Excelsior Mining Corp.

He currently serves as 
Chairman, Advisory Board, Stonehage Fleming
Senior Adviser, Richemont 
Advisory Board, Appian Capital
Director, Excelsior Mining
Chairman, Kropz plc

Publications

Economic Sanctions
Helen Suzman
The End of Apartheid : Diary of a Revolution
A Journey with Margaret Thatcher 
Fighting with Allies : America and Britain in Peace and War
How to Steal a Country
Not Quite a Diplomat (Memoir)

References

The Rhodesia Settlement (De-Classified), Foreign & Commonwealth Office 2021

Robin Renwick, Not Quite a Diplomat (Memoir) Biteback Publishing 2019

Ann Bracken, "How to break into the White House", Biteback Publishing 2021

External links
Interview with Robin William, Lord Renwick & transcript, British Diplomatic Oral History Programme, Churchill College, Cambridge, 1998

1937 births
Living people
People educated at St Paul's School, London
University of Paris alumni
Alumni of Jesus College, Cambridge
Ambassadors of the United Kingdom to the United States
Crossbench life peers
Labour Party (UK) life peers
Life peers created by Elizabeth II
Diplomatic peers
Knights Commander of the Order of St Michael and St George
People from the Royal Borough of Kensington and Chelsea
Ambassadors and High Commissioners of the United Kingdom to South Africa
JPMorgan Chase people